My Best Friend's Girl is a 2008 American romantic comedy film by Howard Deutch and stars Dane Cook, Kate Hudson, Jason Biggs, Diora Baird, Alec Baldwin, and Lizzy Caplan. It was released on September 19, 2008. The film received generally unfavorable reviews from critics and grossed $41 million.

Plot
Sherman "Tank" Turner is a help line operator and a ladies' man with a unique side hustle: He helps guys who want a lady back by taking her on a bad date. Throughout the evening, Tank inevitably behaves moronically, causing the woman to realize her ex is not really so bad after all and go back to him.

Tank shares an apartment with his step cousin Dustin who has fallen for his colleague Alexis. Dustin takes her on a date, professing his love, but she insists they remain friends. After the date, he explains his situation to Tank, who volunteers his services as a good friend (instead of having to pay for it). Initially turning him down, the next day, he sees Alexis flirting with another co-worker and begs Tank to take Alexis out. He accepts.

Tank bumps into Alexis, and they arrange to go out. He behaves badly all night, but she is too drunk to care. When he drops her off she expects him to come in but he resists out of loyalty to Dustin. Alexis calls Dustin, but when they meet, she explains that the date with Tank has motivated her to see other men. Dustin sends Alexis roses and an apology poem in Tank's name, and she calls him, berating him for leaving early the previous night. Tank goes to see her, and they end up having casual sex on a regular basis while Dustin begins a series of desperate attempts to stay friends with her.

Dustin prepares to go on a date with a single mother, but when he arrives to pick her up, she is breast-feeding her child. In an effort to be funny, he awkwardly remarks that he would like to have what the baby is having. Now creeped out and furious, she yells at Dustin, throws him out and cancels their date. Distraught, he goes to Alexis's but is told by her roommate that she is busy upstairs with the guy she has been having sex with regularly. Dustin, even more upset and refusing to leave, starts to walk up the stairs only to discover that the man Alexis has been sleeping with is actually Tank.

Tank and Dustin get into a fight and go their separate ways. Tank's feelings for Alexis have grown, and he decides to consult with his father. After talking with him, he has doubts that he deserves a serious relationship with her. While attending the wedding of Alexis's sister Rachel, he recognizes her as one of his previous bad dates. The groom, Josh asks him to keep quiet about his use of his services. After overhearing Alexis telling Rachel she has fallen for him, Tank's guilt causes him to sabotage their relationship and apologize to Dustin.

Dustin arrives at the wedding reception, revealing Tank's schemes to Alexis. Tank points out his clients, including the groom, and is punched and thrown out. Alexis, distraught since Tank used her and Dustin asked for his help to cheaply win her, never wants to see either of them again. Later, while talking with Dustin and his father, Tank realizes that he loves Alexis, so they encourage him to reconcile with her. Finding her, he jogs with her for a few miles in an attempt to make amends, but Alexis is unmoved.

Three months later, Tank is on a date when Alexis sees him and spontaneously decides to sabotage it by embarrassing him. Throwing wine in his face, she then announces to the whole restaurant that he left her pregnant. He soon catches on to her "joke", and they continue to loudly exchange insults (some of which shadow ones used previously), each trying to best the other in a "play argument" of insults and bantering, after which they reconcile with a kiss.

The film ends, suggesting their relationship is back on. As the titles roll, Dustin and Alexis's roommate Ami sleep together after realizing their common sexual interests.

Cast
 Dane Cook as Sherman 'Tank' Turner, a help line operator with a side business of taking ladies on nightmarish dates.
 Kate Hudson as Alexis, Dustin's co-worker and Tank's love interest.
 Jason Biggs as Dustin, Tank's best friend and roommate.
 Diora Baird as Rachel, Alexis's sister and one of Tank's bad dates.
 Alec Baldwin as Professor William Turner, Tank's father.
 Lizzy Caplan as Ami, Alexis's best friend and roommate.
 Taran Killam as Josh, Rachel's groom.
 Malcolm Barrett as Dwalu, Tank's friend and colleague from the call center.
 Riki Lindhome as Hilary, a deeply Christian girl.
 Mini Anden as Lizzy, one of Tank's one-night-stands.
 Jenny Mollen as Colleen, the new girl
 Robert Fennessy II as the Bartender
 Brad Garrett uncredited cameo as angry customer on phone.
 Nate Torrence as Craig

Soundtrack
The soundtrack available for purchase does not include every song.

 "Do Me" - Jean Knight
 "You're No Good" - Linda Ronstadt
 "My Best Friend's Girl" - The Cars
 "Love Is Like Oxygen" - Sweet
 "99 Red Balloons" - Nena
 "Crimson and Clover" - Tommy James and the Shondells
 "At Last" - Etta James
 "Have a Little Faith in Me" - John Hiatt
 "Save Some" - Glacier Hiking
 "Blue" - Malbec
 "Always Where I Need To Be" - The Kooks
 "Pop That Pussy" - 2 Live Crew
 "Separate Ways" - Teddy Thompson
 "Best Friends Again/I Love You" - John Debney
 "The Man Comes Around" - Johnny Cash

Reception

Critical response
 
Review aggregation website Rotten Tomatoes gives My Best Friend's Girl an approval rating of 14% based on 59 reviews, with an average rating of 4.6/10. The website's critics consensus reads: "My Best Friend's Girl spends too much time being vulgar and offensive, leaving little room for laughs." Metacritic assigned the film an average score of 34 out of 100, based on 13 critics, indicating "generally unfavorable reviews". Audiences polled by CinemaScore gave the film an average grade of "B−" on an A+ to F scale.

My Best Friend's Girl earned a Razzie Award nomination for Worst Actress (Kate Hudson; also for Fool's Gold). Dane Cook also harshly criticized the poster for the film on his Myspace blog.

Box office
The film opened at No. 3 at the North American box office making $8,265,357 USD in its opening weekend. It went on to gross $41.6 million worldwide.

References

External links
 
 
 
 

2008 films
2008 romantic comedy films
American romantic comedy films
2000s English-language films
Films directed by Howard Deutch
Films scored by John Debney
Films set in Boston
Lionsgate films
2000s American films